Chorizanthe blakleyi is a rare species of flowering plant in the buckwheat family known by the common name Blakley's spineflower. It is endemic to the Sierra Madre Mountains of Santa Barbara County, California, where it is known from only eight occurrences, four of which are within the bounds of the Los Padres National Forest. It grows only on north-facing slopes in chaparral and woodland habitat. This plant grows upright to no more than 15 centimeters tall. It is yellow-green and hairy, with a few basal leaves up to about 2 centimeters long. The inflorescence contains several flowers, each surrounded by a tube of six hairy bracts with straight or hooked awns. The flower is a few millimeters wide with white or pink deeply notched tepals.

References

External links
Jepson Manual Treatment
Photo gallery

blakleyi
Endemic flora of California
Natural history of the California chaparral and woodlands
Natural history of the California Coast Ranges
~
Natural history of Santa Barbara County, California